Grgeteg is a village in Serbia. It is situated in the Irig municipality, in the Srem District, Vojvodina province. The village has a Serb ethnic majority among its population of 76 (2011 census).

Grgeteg is home to the Grgeteg Monastery, one of the sixteen monasteries on the Fruška Gora mountain.

Geography
Grgeteg is located in the region of Syrmia, on the southern slopes of Fruška Gora. The village is situated in the northeast of the municipality of Irig, on the Kalin creek. Its territory extends for 632 hectares, with a median altitude of 260 metres. It is the least densely populated place in Vojvodina.

Grgeteg is located 25 kilometres from Novi Sad, 12 kilometres from Irig, and 24 kilometres from Ruma.

History
History of the village is closely tied to the Grgeteg Monastery, which was founded in the 15th century. The village itself was developed in the 18th century as a prnjavor, a rural village inhabited by serfs who were dependent on a religious institution.

According to tradition, the monastery was founded by Despot Vuk Grgurević in 1471, its existence is attested for the first time in 1545-1546. The konak of the monastery dates to the 18th century, and the church houses an iconostasis painted by Uroš Predić in 1902. The monastery is on the Serbian list of Immovable Cultural Heritage of Exceptional Importance.

Demography

Economy
The principal economic activity in Grgeteg is agriculture. Of the 632 hectares that make up the village, 307 of them are occupied by forest and 181 are cultivated. They mostly produce corn, wheat, and alfalfa.

See also
List of places in Serbia
List of cities, towns and villages in Vojvodina

References

Populated places in Syrmia
Serbia geography articles needing translation from French Wikipedia